Cambrian & Clydach Vale Boys & Girls Club is a Welsh football club based in Clydach Vale in the Rhondda Valley. The club was founded in 1965 as Cambrian United and, after playing their football in the South Wales Amateur League for a number of years, they joined the Welsh Football League in 2005. A merger between Cambrian United and Clydach Vale Boys and Girls Club led to the current club. The side have risen through the divisions by finishing in promotion positions in Divisions Three and Two in successive seasons and are currently members of the Cymru South.

History
Cambrian & Clydach Vale was originally formed in 1965 as Cambrian United and was named after the local coal mine, Cambrian Colliery. In its formative years, the club played in the Rhondda & District League before joining the South Wales Corinthian League in 1972. In 1980, Cambrian United merged with Clydach Vale Boys and Girls Club but the merger proved disappointing as the club were nearly relegated out of the renamed South Wales Amateur League. The two clubs subsequently split.

In 1992, Cambrian United returned to the First Division of the South Wales Amateur League after winning the Second Division title. By the end of the decade, the club was regularly competitive at the top of the First Division, missing out on winning the league title during the 2000–01 season after being deducted six points. Cambrian United and Clydach Vale Boys and Girls Club merged for a second time in 2002 to become Cambrian & Clydach Vale Boys and Girls Club and the venture proved more successful. In its third year, the club won the First Division of the South Wales Amateur League and were promoted to the Welsh Football League.

In its first two seasons in the Welsh Football League, the club won consecutive promotions to reach the First Division by the 2007–08 season. The side has remained in the division for over a decade since. Former England manager Terry Venables, whose mother was from the Clydach Vale area, served as an honorary chairman of the club in the 2010s.

The club reached the final of the 2018–19 Welsh League Cup, beating several Welsh Premier League teams during the competition, including defending league and cup champions The New Saints. In the final, Cambrian lost 2–0 to Cardiff Metropolitan University at Jenner Park.

Honours
Welsh League Division One Champions: 2011–12
Welsh League Division One runner-up: 2009–10
Welsh League Division Two runner-up: 2006–07
Welsh League Division Three Champions: 2005–06
South Wales Amateur League Champions: 2004–05
South Wales Amateur League runner-up: 1999–00, 2001–02
Welsh League Cup runner-up: 2018–19

References

External links
Official Website
Official YouTube Channel
Cambrian FC Facebook Group

Football clubs in Wales
Association football clubs established in 1965
1965 establishments in Wales
Sport in Rhondda Cynon Taf
Rhondda Valley
Welsh Football League clubs
Cymru South clubs
South Wales Amateur League clubs